Mikuleč is a municipality and village in Svitavy District in the Pardubice Region of the Czech Republic. It has about 300 inhabitants.

Notable people
Otto Drescher (1895–1944), German general

References

Villages in Svitavy District